Louis Erasmus Albertse (born  in Ermelo, South Africa) is a South African rugby union player who last played for the  in the Currie Cup and in the Rugby Challenge. His regular position is tighthead prop.

Rugby career

2007–2008 : KwaZulu Natal

Albertse grew up in KwaZulu-Natal and earned his first provincial selection in 2007, when he represented KwaZulu-Natal Country Districts at the Under-18 Academy Week. In 2008, he was selected by KwaZulu-Natal for the premier high school rugby union tournament in South Africa, the Under-18 Craven Week held in Pretoria, where he started in all three their matches.

2009–2011 : Golden Lions

After high school, Albertse moved to Johannesburg where he joined the  academy. He was a key member of  that participated in the 2009 Under-19 Provincial Championship. He started five of their matches in the regular season and appeared as a replacement in the other, helping the Golden Lions finish in fourth position on the log to qualify for the semi-finals.

He was named in their squad for the 2011 Under-21 Provincial Championship, but failed to make any appearances in the competition.

2012–2013 : Blue Bulls

Albertse moved to Pretoria to join the  prior to the 2012 season. He was named in their 2012 Vodacom Cup squad, but didn't appear in any matches.

2013–2016 : Aix / Provence

Albertse then moved to France, where he joined a Pays d'Aix side that was newly relegated to the third-tier Fédérale 1 for the 2013–2014 season. He made his debut for them by playing off the bench in their 10–24 defeat to CS Vienne. After another appearance as a replacement against SO Chambéry, he made his first start in a defeat to US Annecy in their next match. He eventually made nine starts and a further eight substitute appearances as Aix finished in third position in Pool 2 of the competition. He started the second leg of their Last 16 play-off fixtures against FC Oloron, helping them progress on aggregate despite a 17–25 defeat. He played in both legs of their quarter final against RC Massy, but could not prevent them losing 50–61 on aggregate to be eliminated from the finals.

Aix had a much-improved season in 2014–15, winning fifteen of their eighteen matches in Pool 4 of the competition to qualify for the finals for the second season in succession. Albertse was once again a regular player, featuring in eleven of their matches during the regular season. He started the second leg of their Last 16 match against Montluçon Rugby, helping them progress 45–29 on aggregate and then helped them go one step further that in 2013–2014 by winning their Quarter Final tie against RC Aubenas; Albertse played in the second leg of a 48–43 aggregate victory. He also played in their 27–12 victory over SO Chambéry, where Aix overturned a 10–24 defeat in the first leg to win 37–36 on aggregate, and in the final, where he came on as a replacement on the hour mark to help Aix secure a 12–6 victory to win the championship and gain promotion to the 2015–2016 Pro D2.

Aix changed their name to Provence Rugby shortly after securing promotion and Albertse made seven appearances for the team in the Rugby Pro D2 competition. In February 2016, Albertse played his last match for Provence, helping them to a 30–16 victory over  before leaving the club to return to South Africa. He made a total of 39 appearances for the team, without scoring any tries during his time there.

2016 : Southern Kings

References

South African rugby union players
Living people
1990 births
People from Ermelo, Mpumalanga
Rugby union props
Blue Bulls players
Southern Kings players
Alumni of Michaelhouse
Rugby union players from KwaZulu-Natal
Provence Rugby players
Expatriate rugby union players in France
Pumas (Currie Cup) players
South African expatriate rugby union players
Rugby union players from Mpumalanga
South African expatriate sportspeople in France